Patrick Cramer (born 3 February 1969 in Stuttgart, West Germany) is a German chemist, structural biologist, and molecular systems biologist. In 2020, he was honoured to be an international member of the National Academy of Sciences.

Life 
Cramer studied chemistry at the Universities of Stuttgart and Heidelberg (Germany) from 1989 until 1995. He completed a part of his studies as ERASMUS scholar at the University of Bristol in the UK. As a research student he also worked in the lab of Sir Alan Fersht in Cambridge, UK at the MRC Laboratory for Molecular Biology (LMB) site. In 1995 until 1998 he worked as a PhD student in laboratory of Christoph W. Müller at the European Molecular Biology Laboratory (EMBL) in Grenoble, France. He obtained his PhD in natural sciences (Dr. rer. nat.) from the University of Heidelberg in 1998. From 1999 until 2001 Cramer worked as postdoctoral researcher and fellow of the German Research Foundation (DFG) in the laboratory of the later Nobel Prize laureate Roger D. Kornberg at Stanford University, USA.

In 2001 Patrick Cramer returned to Germany, where he obtained a tenure-track professorship for biochemistry at the Gene Center of the University of Munich (Ludwig Maximilians University, LMU where he was later, in 2004, appointed full professor of biochemistry. Patrick Cramer headed the Gene Center of the University of Munich for 10 years, from 2004 until 2013. He also served as Dean of the School of Chemistry and Pharmacy from 2007 to 2009, and as Director of the Department of Biochemistry from 2010 to 2013. Cramer also was a member of the University Research Board from 2007 to 2013 and speaker of the research network grant SFB464 of the German Research Council (DFG).

On 1 January 2014 Patrick Cramer was appointed Director at the Max Planck Institute for Biophysical Chemistry in Göttingen, Germany.

From 2016 to 2022 he was a member of the Editorial Board for Cell.

In June 2023, he will become the president of the Max Planck Society.

Achievements 
Patrick Cramer conducts basic research as the head of the Department of Molecular Biology at the Max Planck Institute in Göttingen. He also works as a science manager and an honorary professor at the University of Göttingen. During his postdoctoral research with Roger Kornberg, Cramer determined the atomic, three-dimensional structure of RNA polymerase II, one of the biggest enzymes in the cell nucleus. This work played a decisive role when the Nobel Prize in chemistry was awarded to Roger Kornberg in 2006 for studies of the molecular basis of eukaryotic transcription.

The laboratory of Patrick Cramer investigates the molecular mechanisms and systemic principles of gene transcription in eukaryotic cells. The laboratory uses integrated structural biology methods, including X-ray crystallography, cryo-electron microscopy, and biochemical tools. The Cramer laboratory also uses functional genomics and computational biology approaches to study the principles of transcription in living cells.

The group of Patrick Cramer created the first molecular movie of transcription initiation and elongation. Moreover, Patrick Cramer developed methods to analyze fundamental aspects of RNA metabolism in cells by integrating aspects of both molecular and systems biology. His long-term goal is to understand the expression and the regulation of the genome. The laboratory thus pioneers an approach that combines structural and genome-wide methods and may be referred to as molecular systems biology.

In April 2020, Dr Cramer's team at the Max Planck Institute of Biophysical Chemistry created the first "3D structure of the corona polymerase" for the COVID-19 virus. Their model will allow researchers "to investigate how antiviral drugs such as remdesivir – which blocks the polymerase – work, and to search for new inhibitory substances."

Patrick Cramer also commits himself to the further development of life sciences in Germany and Europe. He was one of the founders of the national cluster of excellence "Center for Integrated Protein Science (CIPSM)" and initiated the construction of the new research building, the "Munich Research Center for Molecular Biosystems (BioSysM)". In addition, Cramer was one of the members of the scientific and technical advisory board of the Bavarian state government and worked on bioethics within the institute TTN. Patrick Cramer also serves as an organizer of international conferences, and on several scientific committees and advisory boards. Since 2016 Cramer chairs the Council of the European Molecular Biology Laboratory (EMBL)

Publications

Original research articles (selection)

Review articles (selection)

Other publications (selection) 
 Aufbruch in die molekulare Systembiology. - Essay for the anniversary edition "20 Jahre Laborjournal", Published in Laborjournal on 11 July 2014.
 Entwicklungen in der Biomedizin: Genom-Sequenzierung in Diagnose, Prävention und Therape; Systembiologie und Medizin. In: T. Rendtorff (Hrsg.): Zukunft der biomedizinischen Wissenschaften. Nomos, 2013, .
 O. Primavesi, P. Cramer, R. Hickel, T. O. Höllmann; W. Schön: Lob der Promotion. Published in Frankfurter Allgemeine Zeitung on 19 July 2013.
 J. Hacker, T. Rendtorff, P. Cramer, M. Hallek, K. Hilpert, C. Kupatt, M. Lohse, A. Müller, U Schroth, F. Voigt, M. Zichy. Biomedizinische Eingriffe am Menschen – Ein Stufenmodell zur ethischen Bewertung von Gen- und Zelltherapie. Water de Gruyter, Berlin.  (2009).

Awards and honours (selection) 

 2000 EMBO Young Investigator Award
 2000 MSC Future Investigator Award
 2002 GlaxoSmithKline Science Award
 2004 10th Eppendorf Award for Young European Researchers
 2006 Leibniz Prize
 2008 Bijvoet Medal, Bijvoet Center for Biomolecular Research, Utrecht University
 2009 Ernst Jung Prize for Medicine
 2009 Familie-Hansen-Award, Bayer Science & Education Foundation
 2009 Member, German National Academy of Sciences (Leopoldina)
 2009 Member, European Molecular Biology Laboratory (EMBL)
 2010 Advanced Grant of the European Research Council ('TRANSIT')
 2010 Medal of Honour, Robert Koch Institute
 2011 Feldberg Foundation Prize
 2012 Vallee Foundation Visiting Professorship
 2012 Cross of Merit of the Federal Republic of Germany
 2012 Paula und Richard von Hertwig Preis
 2015 Arthur Burkhardt Preis
 2015 Guest Professor, Karolinska Institutet, Stockholm, Sweden
 2016 Advanced Grant of the European Research Council ('TRANSREGULON')
 2016 Centenary Award of the British Biochemical Society
 2017 Elected Member, Academia Europaea
 2017 Honorary Professor, Georg August University of Göttingen
 2017 Weigle Lectureship, University of Geneva
 2018 Inaugural George William Jourdian Lectureship, University of Michigan
 2019 Ernst Schering Prize
 2020 Otto Warburg Medal
 2021 Louis-Jeantet Prize for Medicine

References

External links 
 Patrick Cramer at the Max Planck Institute for Biophysical Chemistry in Göttingen
 List of publications
 Cramer at the Gene Center Munich
 Porträt at the Deutschen Forschungsgesellschaft

1969 births
Living people
German biochemists
21st-century German biologists
Stanford University alumni
Academic staff of the Ludwig Maximilian University of Munich
Science teachers
Gottfried Wilhelm Leibniz Prize winners
European Research Council grantees
Recipients of the Cross of the Order of Merit of the Federal Republic of Germany
Bijvoet Medal recipients
Foreign associates of the National Academy of Sciences
Max Planck Institute directors